Buttermere is a lake in the English Lake District.

Buttermere may also refer to:

 Buttermere, Cumbria (village), the village by the lake
 Buttermere, Wiltshire, a village in the county of Wiltshire, England